Montefeltrano II da Montefeltro (died 1255) was an Italian condottiero, who was lord of Urbino from 1242 until his death. He was also count of Montefeltro and Pietrarubbia.

He was son of Bonconte I da Montefeltro, first duke of Urbino. He was Ghibelline follower and fought for Philip of Swabia in Sicily, to defend the Hohenstaufen rights there. He was succeeded in Urbino by his son Guido I da Montefeltro.

Notes

References

Montefeltro, Montefeltrano 2
Montefeltrano 22I
Montefeltro, Montefeltrano 2
Counts of Urbino
Year of birth unknown